The New Heroes (US series title: Quantum Prophecy) is a series of novels and short stories by Michael Carroll, first published in January 2006 by HarperCollins in the UK. The stories centre on realistic depictions of superhuman abilities manifesting in the world and the subsequent appearance of superheroes and villains. The first trilogy follows young adolescents as they become aware of their abilities and the danger that those powers may put them in. In December 2007, the author published a collection of short stories entitled Superhuman, which expanded upon the mythology.

The first in the original HarperCollins trilogy is titled The Quantum Prophecy (January 2006), the second is Sakkara (October 2006) and the third Absolute Power (July 2007). A prequel series has been completed, this series includes four novels, beginning with Super Human. The other three novels in the prequel series are: The Ascension, Stronger, and Hunter.
Crossfire, released in October, 2015, and The Chasm, released in June 2017, make up the final two books in the series, both taking place after the original trilogy.

The Quantum Prophecy
The first of the original trilogy.

Plot summary
The story opens with a seemingly random battle among the many superhumans that inhabited the western world, set ten years ago at the foot of a gigantic tank that was on its way to New York City. During the course of this slugfest, the superheroes and supervillains all seem to lose their abilities.

Ten years later, Colin Wagner and Danny Cooper, the children of these superhumans are discovering their abilities and they soon learn that they have also inherited their parents' enemies. The teenagers are kidnapped in order to calibrate the machine that might take away their powers and stop a war that was prophesied by Danny's father, the man once known as Quantum. Danny was believed to be the cause of this war, and so he allowed the supervillain known as Façade to take his place to let Maxwell Dalton record his visions of the future as he broke down. They had hoped to avert it by stripping the world of superpowers ten years ago, but the machine was destroyed and Danny's powers continued to manifest. The new machine would be unstable, and potentially kill hundreds of thousands of people, but it was a risk they were willing to take. With the help of old heroes, including the frozen in time Renata Soliz (Diamond), they stop this from happening and have those behind the plot taken away. By the end of the book, they realise how much risk is involved in becoming superhuman, with Danny's arm now missing, his real father dead, and many lives irrevocably changed.

US title and publishers
In the United States, the series was originally published by Philomel Books as Quantum Prophecy, and so the titles of the books were changed. The series is to be republished by Puffin Books starting in 2008.

Reception
The Quantum Prophecy was nominated for the Ottakar's 2006 Children's Book Prize. The book received positive reviews from nearly all critics, but some criticised the kitsch marketing of the series.

Sakkara
The second of the New Heroes trilogy.

Plot summary
Sakkara revolves around the titular superpowers research facility in the heart of the United States. The adolescent superhumans of The Quantum Prophecy return. Their covers are blown and they are forced to flee to the US in order to protect themselves from attack and publicity. The facility that they hide in is thought to be secret, until its name is known around the world following a terrorist attack in which the supervillain-turned-assassin leaves the word Sakkara spraypainted on the wall of an airport after killing dozens of people. Someone among the "New Heroes" or "old heroes" has broken protocol, but everyone is a suspect. As more and more attacks begin to occur, the pattern emerges that they are going after Trutopians. Trutopians are an international organisation designed to give each of its members security and equality, but with reduced freedoms. It is revealed that they are run by the antagonist of the last novel, Victor Cross, who has his own ideas of international peace and wishes to impose them on the world.

US title
The Gathering (July 2008)

Reception
Nominated for Best Novel in the British Science Fiction Association Awards in 2006.

Absolute Power

A direct continuation of the previous book.

Synopsis
Not so long ago, the world believed superhumans dead after a great battle wiped out heroes and villains alike. Ten years later, "The New Heroes", a group of second-generation youngsters possessing superhuman powers have emerged and are now faced with difficult decisions when their leader Colin Wagner runs away in the midst of a political attack from the globe-spanning Trutopian organization led, unknown to them, by their enemy Victor Cross and his accomplice Yvonne. The pair have begun to plant the seeds of a dark shadow game that will manipulate the heroes into a series of actions that threaten to throw the world into war. If the planet is to survive, the new heroes will have to fight harder than they have ever have before.

Plot summary
The lives of the teenagers have been changed forever, and they decide to proactively use their powers of their own free will, in order to better the world. Collin does not know that the Trutopians are led by Victor Cross and he soon finds himself under the spell of Yvonne's mind-control. Unable to resist Yvonne's orders Collin soon finds himself turned against his fellow heroes, fighting on the side of the very people he had vowed to bring to justice.

US Title

In the United States, Absolute Power, the third book in the series, is published under the title The Reckoning. (June 2010)

Superhuman
Superhuman is a collection of short stories set in the New Heroes universe. One story is long enough to be considered a novella, however. The author released the book exclusively through the New Heroes website in December 2007, and each one is signed and numbered. It is limited to 1,000 copies.

Stories
Below is a list of the individual stories contained in the book. The book also contains a number of articles, and has a foreword written by Michael Scott.
 "A Decade Without Heroes"
 "What I Did on My Holidays"
 "The Offer"
 "Pressure"
 "The Footsoldiers"
 "Out of Sight"
 "Flesh and Blood"
 "Scholarship Boy"
 "A Million"

Super Human
A prequel to the events of the New Heroes trilogy called Super Human was released on the official New Heroes website. It was released May 13, 2010.

Plot summary
A mysterious group is trying to bring Krodin, a four-thousand-year-old super human, forward in time to control the modern world. The story begins with Abby, a seemingly average girl with the power of superhuman strength, but only with metal. She is in the middle of working at a dinner when a television report comes on about a siege at a nearby warehouse that a terrorist group is using to hold hostages. Abby rushes to the scene, along with a mysterious and quiet boy that would come to the dinner daily. Abby and the boy (who is revealed to be Thunder and has the power of sound wave manipulation) try to infiltrate the warehouse with the help of Paragon and the US Military.

The Ascension
Another prequel to the events of the New Heroes trilogy, and a sequel to Super Human, The Ascension was released summer 2011. The plot involves Krodin who has mysteriously survived death by being sent back in time by six years after his battle with Abby, Thunder, Roz and Brawn. In the present the kids begin to notice changes in their America. It was released on June 30, 2011 and is the fifth book in the New Heroes series.

Stronger
The sixth book in the New Heroes series was released on June 14, 2012. It is the backstory of Brawn, a rather minor villain of the series up until this point.

All Gethin Rao wants is to be like every other boy his age. But normal twelve-year-olds are not blue. And they certainly are not thirteen feet tall. That is what happens when his superpowers kick in. And from that moment on, his life is never the same. Nicknamed Brawn and treated as a villain – a monster – Gethin spends years on the run or as a prisoner in a secret military facility. When he finally falls in with a group of superpowered teens, he becomes the one thing he never thought he would be: a hero. But as the years pass, Gethin learns that being a good guy is a lot more difficult than he thought.

Hunter
The defeat of the near-invincible villain Krodin has left a void in the superhuman hierarchy, a void that two opposing factions are trying to fill. The powerful telepath Max Dalton believes that the human race must be controlled and shepherded to a safe future, while his rival Casey Duval believes that strength can only be achieved through conflict.

Caught in the middle is Lance McKendrick, a teenager with no special powers, only his wits and the tricks of a con artist. But Lance has a mission of his own: Krodin's ally, the violent and unpredictable supervillain Slaughter, murdered Lance's family, and he intends to make her pay.

Hunter was published in the US on May 1, 2014.

Crossfire 
The world is slowly recovering from the chaos of the Trutopian War, but that was only the beginning. A dangerous enemy has emerged, and the New Heroes quickly find themselves outmatched and outnumbered. When their enemy starts to pick off their colleagues one-by-one, they realize that in order to win, they must fight the battle on the enemy's terms... But how far are they willing to go to save the simp race?

Crossfire is the eighth book overall and is the first book of a final series taking place after the original trilogy. It was published worldwide in October, 2015.

The Chasm
The Chasm is the ninth and final book in the Quantum Prophecy series. It takes place after Crossfire and sees the return of Krodin. It was published worldwide in June, 2017.

Heroes
New Heroes
Colin Wagner (aka Kid Titan, Titan, and Power) – a major protagonist in the series with incredible superhuman strength and hearing. His best friend is Danny Cooper. He is the son of Titan and Energy,(former superheroes who lost their powers in the fight on Mystery Day ten years prior) inheriting both of their strength and powers. In the second book, it is revealed that Colin can absorb and manipulate energy, usually in the form of heat/fire and electricity and in the final book he gains the ability to fly.
Danny Cooper – another hero in the series. He is the son of Quantum, inheriting his precognition, intangibility, and superhuman speed. It is later revealed that Danny can control time, speeding or slowing it, stopping or altering it in any way. He is believed by Quantum and Max Dalton to be a key component in bringing about the apocalypse. At the end of the first book he lost his right arm to stop the power-dampener, which was replaced with a cybernetic arm in book three. He and Renata are in love.
Renata Soliz (aka Diamond) – a heroine who can turn herself into an indestructible crystalline form. She was trapped in her statue state for ten years after the power-dampener froze her. Biologically, she is fourteen, though chronologically, she is twenty-four. She was awakened by a flawed power-dampener and teamed up with Colin and Danny to stop the machine. She teamed up with Colin for a while until the heroes' identity were revealed, when they relocated to Sakkara. Her parents are revealed to a part of the organization the Trutopian. It is revealed in Absolute Power that she can control the part of her body to crystal and can crystallize others as well. She used the last of her power to crystallize Earth to stop the Trutopian war and return it to its former state, as revealed by Mina. By the end of Absolute Power, it is believed that she has lost her powers forever due to the strain of crystallizing the Earth. In Crossfire, a device successfully returns her powers.
Butler Redmond – a young man who has the ability to produce a telekinetic force field. He is the least popular of the New Heroes due to his obnoxious behavior, but is proven in Absolute Power to be useful when the Truthopians attack on Sakkara. He is killed in Crossfire.
Mina – a hero and biological sister of Yvonne. In Sakkara she is considered quiet and shy, but she is later revealed to be controlled by Yvonne. In the final book of the Quantum Prophecy it is revealed that Mina has incredible strength and short-range teleportation. She can also sense auras.
Yvonne – one of the main antagonists and biological sister to Mina. Yvonne has enhanced strength, an enormous IQ, and the ability to control almost anyone's mind. In Sakkara it is believed that along with Mina, she had been living in the facility all her life. With the help of Victor Cross, she helped him nearly destroy the New Heroes and bring his organization, known as the Truthopians, (an evil organization that recruits its members by spreading the word of peace and trust throughout its community) to fruition. In Absolute Power, she takes over the organization and causes a war between the Truthopians and the rest of the world, only to be stopped by the New Heroes.
Stephanie Cord – the daughter of the armored superhero Paragon, she is well trained in martial arts and is capable of piloting his jet pack. She is a member of the new heroes and is a leader in their armored division. She is in an on and off relationship with Colin.
Garland Lighthouse (aka Razor) – was a homeless street teen living in a shelter for runaways until Colin shows up and they help each other out. It is revealed that he is the son of Lance McKendrick.
Heroes (prequel series)
Lance McKendrick – a proto-superhuman with some form of Empathy. He is the father of Garland Lighthouse (aka Razor).
Rosalyn Dalton – a telekinetic with the power to move objects with her mind and create shields of telekinetic energy, she is also the sister of Josh and Max Dalton.
Abigail de Luyando (aka Hesperus) – a girl with enhanced speed, resilience, flight, and massively increased strength, though only with metal objects. She is also bulletproof, wields a metal sword, and wears a metal collapsible bow on her arm, with carbon steel arrows capable of "killing an elephant". She shows up at the end of Crossfire.
Thunder (James Klaus) – a protagonist, with a near-genius IQ and the ability to manipulate sound waves. He uses this ability to fly.
Background heroes
Titan – a former hero who was superhumanly strong and fast and had the ability to fly. He lost his powers ten years prior to the beginning of the main story; revealed to be Warren Wagner, the father of Colin Wagner.
Energy – a former heroine who had the ability to absorb energy and manipulate it and who could fly. She lost her powers ten years prior to the beginning of the main story; revealed to be the mother of Colin Wagner.
Paragon – a former hero who did not have superhuman powers, instead utilizing a jet-pack and protective armor. Was killed by Dioxin in Sakkara in order to spare Renata's family.
Apex – the first confirmed sighting of Apex took place about six years before the superhumans disappeared, though several earlier sightings are now believed to have been incorrectly attributed to Paragon. Though Apex spoke very little and almost always remained in the background, he quickly became a favourite with the public and – aside from Titan and Max Dalton – more has been written about Apex than any other superhero. He is also described to be ruthless when dealing with all criminals, from common muggers to super-villains. He had super-human strength and agility. 
Thalamus – a proto-superhuman with greatly increased intelligence.
Octavian – little is known about Octavian. He appears very infrequently and does not appear to have taken part in any major battles.
Impervia – helps Colin and his superhuman counterparts in the second quantum prophecy. She had superhuman strength, durability, and flight, but lost her powers to the power dampener.
Quantum – Danny's father. He was driven insane by his precognition and as a result his civilian identity was replaced by reformed shapeshifting super villain Façade.
Inferno
Zephyr
Maxwell Dalton – former superhero who had the power of mind control.
Joshua Dalton – former superhero who had the power of Telekinesis.
Daedalus – the alternate reality version of Casey Duval. He had superhuman intelligence, strength, and durability, and also has a high tech avian-like battle suit.
The Poder-Meninas
Alia Cord – one of Solomon Cord (Paragon)'s twin daughters, she believed that when Colin Wagner made the decision to save Renata's family and kill Solomon Cord, it was not his fault.
The Rangers
The White Wasp
Grant Paramjeet – a boy who wants Stephanie Cord to teach him how to be a superhero like her father, Paragon.
Brawn – rather than a bad guy, he was just misunderstood. People assumed he was a villain or a monster, so he was viewed by many people as evil. He is the only one resistant to Max Dalton's mind control, as revealed in the sixth book.

Villains
Villains throughout the novels:                
Victor Cross – the main antagonist. He possesses the power of superhuman intelligence.
Evan Laurie – Cross's personal assistant.
Yvonne – a mind-controlling psychokinetic superhuman who is a superhuman clone. She was found in a glass jar at Ragnarok's secret base, which was an apartment block. Yvonne's mind control can be resisted if there is a filter on a phone or speaker that shorts out the controlling properties of her voice. Even though she tries to destroy America, the new heroes stop her and put her in prison. Shortly after this, someone gets close enough to her that they are able to put a bullet in her vocal cords. She survives, but will never speak again. She also has superhuman intelligence and strength.
Ragnarok/Casey Duval – a superhuman with superhuman intelligence, strength, durability, and the ability to see and know a superhuman's powers. Created the power-dampener, stripping all superhumans of their powers, including himself. He dies while battling Paragon.
Dioxin – super-villain turned hired assassin following Mystery Day. He was able to produce venomous acid from his body. The loss of powers physically deformed him due to no longer being immune to his body's acids.
Slaughter – one of the main protagonists in the book Super Human, he is a high-ranked officer in the organization called the Helotry, can fly, heal quickly, and is resistant to many things and is incredibly strong. He had a bad temper.
Terrain- telekinetic whose powers can move large amounts of natural and environmental materials, like sand, dirt, and stone
Krodin – the main antagonist in Superhuman and Ascension who was a warlord during ancient times. He is worshiped by the Helotry and considered the first superhuman. He has superhuman strength, durability, regeneration, and telepathy. He is also experienced in hand-to-hand combatant and very cunning. He is very adaptable; certain attacks only work once on him.
Facade – Niall's father and Danny's half-father. He takes the place of Quantum's secret identity, PJ Cooper, to help watch over Danny and make sure that he does not develop his superhuman powers. He ends up helping the klids over time, and Danny starts to forgive him. Niall also might develop Facade's former shapeshifting powers since Facade is his father.
Alexandria, also known as Krodin's wife (the old woman) – part of the ancient resistance that resisted Krodin's rule in ancient times.
The Scarlet Slayer – a villain who was imprisoned with Brawn in Stronger, having superhuman strength, durability, and flight. Was not very bright. 
The Shark
Gyrobot – a villain mentioned in Stronger with superhuman intelligence. Could create weapons from simple devices.
Schizophrenzy
Waspider – a superhuman who, as described by Brawn in Stronger, can move incredibly fast on all four legs, like a spider. Is called half wasp because his attacking tactic is similar to that of a wasp.
Harmony Yuan
Dr. Tremont
Gladius
Remington
Termite
Texanimal
The Red Fury
Brawn – four-meter high superhuman that possesses super human strength and durability, entirely blue with colorless eyes and no hair.
Pyrokine – a boy who is introduced and killed in the book Super Human after defeating the ancient King and superhuman Krodin. He does this by engulfing himself with energy and light so hot it kills himself and sends Krodin back in time. He was also Rosalyn Dalton's boyfriend a few months before Maxwell Dalton terminated their relationship and framed Pyrokine for a crime, which he was locked up for. He could turn matter into energy.

Trivia
Crossfire, The Chasm, and the short story collection Superhuman were all published under the company MaxEdDal Publications, the author's private publishing name for this series. It is named after the in-universe corporation MaxEdDal Pharmaceuticals, run by the character Maxwell Edwin Dalton.

References

External links

 The New Heroes Website
 More About Michael Carroll
 Michael Carroll's Sakkara ad on YouTube
 Review from the San Francisco Chronicle

Superhero novels
Children's science fiction novels
Science fiction book series
Young adult novel series
Irish young adult novels
HarperCollins books